The Carlisle Colts was the initial moniker of the minor league baseball teams based in Carlisle, Pennsylvania between 1896 and 1904. The Carlisle teams played as members of the Cumberland Valley League in 1896 and Pennsylvania League in 1904.

History
Carlisle, Pennsylvania first hosted minor league baseball when 1896 Carlisle Colts began play. The Colts began play as members of the four–team Independent level Cumberland Valley League. Carlisle joined the Chambersburg Maroons, Hagerstown Lions and Hanover Tigers playing in the league.

The Colts began play on June 10, 1896. The Chambersburg Maroons folded during the season, causing the Cumberland Valley League to permanently fold on August 9, 1896. Carlisle finished in 3rd place in the 1896 Cumberland Valley League. The Colts ended the  season with a 14–23 record, finishing 11.5 games behind the 1st place Hagerstown Lions in the final league standings.

In 1904, the Carlisle team resumed minor league play as members of the Independent level Pennsylvania League.

The 1904 Pennsylvania League was a six–team league. Joining Carlisle in the Pennsylvania League were the teams based in Coatesville, Chester, Johnstown, Pennsylvania (Johnstown Johnnies), Oxford, Pennsylvania and Pottstown, Pennsylvania. While rosters exist, the team records and statistics of the 1904 Pennsylvania League are unknown.

The Pennsylvania League permanently folded after the 1904 season and Carlisle, Pennsylvania has not hosted another minor league team.

The ballpark
The exact name and location of the Carlisle home minor league ballpark is unknown. Facilities at Dickinson College, founded in 1783, were in use in the era.

Timeline

Year-by-year records

Notable alumni

Ernie Beam (1896)
Wid Conroy (1896)
Jack Egan (1896)
Danny Green (1896)
Frank Jude (1904)
Harry Wilhelm (1896)
Zeke Wrigley (1896)

See also
Carlisle Colts players
Carlisle (minor league baseball) players

References

External links
Baseball Reference

Defunct baseball teams in Pennsylvania
Baseball teams established in 1896
Baseball teams disestablished in 1896
Cumberland Valley League teams
Carlisle, Pennsylvania